Wladyslaw Tomasz Rawicz-Ostrowski (1790-1869) was a Polish nobleman (szlachcic), Count since 1798.

Wladyslaw was officer of the horse artillery in the army of the Duchy of Warsaw. He was awarded with the Virtuti Militari in 1809 after the Battle of Raszyn and with the Légion d'honneur order for Napoleon's Russian Campaign from 1812 to 1813.

He left the army after Napoleon's defeat. Later he tried his skills in poetry (he translated Lord Byron's poems). In December 1830 he was elected the Marshal of the Sejm of the Kingdom of Poland and served until the end of the national November Uprising of 1830–1831. In emigration he became an activist of Hotel Lambert. Interned by the Austrians he spent most of his life in Graz and in 1861 was allowed to settle down in Kraków.

Awards
 Virtuti Militari in 1809.
 Légion d'honneur in 1813.

Notes

1790 births
1869 deaths
Nobility from Warsaw
People from Masovian Voivodeship (1526–1795)
Polish Army officers
Polish commanders of the Napoleonic Wars
Recipients of the Virtuti Militari
Marshals of the Sejm of a Partitioned Poland
November Uprising participants
Recipients of the Legion of Honour
Members of Polish government (November Uprising)